The Duilio class was a pair of ironclad turret ships built for the Royal Italian Navy (Regia Marina) in the 1870s and 1880s. To save weight on such large vessels, the ship's designer, Benedetto Brin adopted a radical solution for the time: he reserved armor only for the central portion of the ship where it protected the ships' engines and ammunition magazines, while the rest of the hull were extensively sub-divided with watertight compartments.

Both ships had uneventful careers. They spent the majority of their time in service with the Active and Reserve Squadrons of the main Italian fleet. There, they were primarily occupied with conducting training exercises. In 1895–1898, Enrico Dandolo was heavily reconstructed, but the excessive cost of the modernization prevented Duilio from being similarly rebuilt. Both ships were reassigned as training ships in the early to mid-1900s. Duilio was stricken from the naval register in 1909 and converted into a floating oil tank, while Enrico Dandolo remained in service as a guard ship during World War I. She was sent to the breaker's yard in 1920. Duilios ultimate fate is unknown.

Design
Starting in the early 1870s, following the Italian fleet's defeat at the Battle of Lissa, the Italians began a large naval expansion program, initially aimed at countering the Austro-Hungarian Navy. In addition, the opening of the Suez Canal in 1869 promised to restore the strategic significance of the Mediterranean; Italy would need a powerful fleet to assert its will and protect its merchant shipping in the region. The program began with the Duilio class, which was designed by the naval architect Benedetto Brin. Originally intended to carry Armstrong  muzzle-loading guns, they were modified several times during their lengthy construction time to accommodate the largest guns that Armstrong produced, next to  guns and ultimately to the  450 mm gun.

Brin had originally wanted to build three ships, but their great cost forced him to settle for two. At the time, Italy's industrial capacity was insufficient to build the ships out of domestic material. Everything from the iron used to build the hulls to the ships' machinery and guns had to be imported.

General characteristics and machinery

The ships had a small superstructure forward that included the conning tower and one funnel; this was connected via a hurricane deck to a central military mast and the aft superstructure, with included a second funnel. They were the first ironclads in any navy to dispense with sails, rigged only with the military mast. The ships had a crew of 420 officers and men, which later increased to 515.

The ships' propulsion system consisted of two vertical compound steam engines each driving a single screw propeller, with steam supplied by eight coal-fired, rectangular boilers. The boilers were in two groups, one forward and one aft, and each group was trunked into a single large funnel. Specific figures for Enrico Dandolos original engines have not survived.

Armament and armor

Duilio and Enrico Dandolo were armed with a main battery of four  100-ton guns of 20-caliber, mounted in two turrets placed en echelon amidships. These guns fired a  shell at a muzzle velocity of  depending on the propellant charge. They had a rate of fire of one shot per fifteen minutes; the guns fired so slowly primarily as a result of their great size. As was customary for capital ships of the period, they carried three  torpedo tubes.

Throughout their careers, the ships' armament was revised significantly. In 1900, two  guns, eight  40-caliber quick-firing guns, and four  20-caliber revolver cannon were also added. The 57 mm guns were manufactured by Nordenfelt and they fired a  shell. Enrico Dandolo was rebuilt in 1895–1898, and her armament was completely revised. In place of her 17.7 in guns she received four  40-caliber QF guns. Her secondary battery consisted of five  40-caliber guns, sixteen  43-caliber QF guns—slightly longer versions of the same-caliber guns fitted to Duilio—eight  20-caliber Hotchkiss revolver cannon, and four machine guns.

The belt armor plate was manufactured by the French steel mill Schneider-Creusot. The central citadel and the gun turrets received new nickel steel armor. The ships' bow and stern were not armored, but they were extensively subdivided into a cellular "raft" that was intended to reduce the risk of flooding.

 
The lack of armor on both ends of the design sparked controversy: after the former Chief Constructor of the Royal Navy Edward James Reed visited the ships under construction, he criticized this particular design feature, arguing that in case of damage to either end the entering water would have compromised the stability; the new Italian Minister of the Navy, Simone Pacoret di Saint-Bon, replied during a Parliament session that such an event was very unlikely, as it could happen only if all the bulkheads of the watertight compartments were destroyed.

Ships

Service history

During gunnery trials in March 1880 shortly after entering service, one of Duilios guns in her aft turret burst. After joining the fleet, both ships served in the Active Squadron, though they alternated between it and the Reserve Squadron throughout their careers. During this period, they were chiefly occupied with conducting training maneuvers. Italy joined the Triple Alliance with the German Empire and Austria-Hungary in 1882, shortly after the two Duilios entered service; as a result, the country's most likely opponent became France. The exercises in which the ships took part therefore frequently simulated defensive operations against a hostile, numerically superior French Mediterranean Fleet. For the 1893 maneuvers, Duilio was part of the squadron that simulated the defending Italian fleet, while Enrico Dandolo operated on the opposing force.

Starting in 1895, Enrico Dandolo was extensively modernized, receiving an entirely new armament and new engines, as well as a second military mast. Duilio received a much more limited refit in 1900, primarily receiving a large number of secondary guns. The Navy decided against rebuilding her along the same lines as Enrico Dandolo due to the prohibitive cost of the project. In 1902, Diulio was removed from front-line service and thereafter employed as a training ship. Enrico Dandolo followed her in 1905 for service as a gunnery training vessel. In 1909, Duilio was stricken from the naval register, disarmed, and converted into a floating oil tank. Her ultimate fate is unknown. Enrico Dandolo continued on in service for a few more years, first becoming a guard ship at Tobruk, Libya in 1913. After Italy entered World War I in May 1915, she was transferred to Brindisi and later Venice, where she continued guard ship duties. She was stricken in January 1920 and broken up for scrap.

Notes

References
 
 
 
 
 
 

 
 

 
Ships built in Italy
Battleship classes